

Highest-grossing films

List of films
A list of films released in Japan in 1995 (see 1995 in film).

See also
1995 in Japan
1995 in Japanese television

References

Bibliography

External links
 Japanese films of 1995 at the Internet Movie Database

1995
Japanese
Films